Diex is a town in the district of Völkermarkt in Austrian state of Carinthia. It is known for its Gothic fortified church on a hilltop.

Geography
Diex lies in southeast Carinthia on the southern slope of the Saualpe high above the Jaun valley and the Lavant valley.

Population

References

Cities and towns in Völkermarkt District